Monoxenus nigrovitticollis is a species of beetle in the family Cerambycidae. It was described by Stephan von Breuning in 1956.

References

nigrovitticollis
Beetles described in 1956